Blaustein is a surname. Notable people with the surname include:
 Albert Blaustein (1921–1994), American lawyer and constitutional consultant
 David Blaustein, ABC News Radio correspondent and movie critic
 David Blaustein (educator) (1866–1912), Belarusian-American educator, rabbi, and social worker
 Jeremy Blaustein (born 1966), American translator
 Julian Blaustein (1913–1995), American film producer
 Louis Blaustein, American businessman and philanthropist
 Maddie Blaustein (1960–2008), American voice actress
 Susana Blaustein Muñoz, Argentine film director

See also
 Blaustein Building, Baltimore, Maryland
 Bluestein
 Jacob Blaustein Institutes for Desert Research, an academic facility of the Ben-Gurion University of the Negev

German-language surnames
Yiddish-language surnames